Seinäjoki Crocodiles are an American football team from Seinäjoki, Finland. The team plays in the Finnish Maple League and it has also played in the European Football League. The Crocodiles are one of the top teams in Finland and Europe.

Accomplishments
 1996 - 3rd Place
 2000 - 2nd Place
 2001 - 1st Place Maple League National Champions	
 2002 - 3rd Place
 2004 - 3rd Place	
 2005 - 2nd Place
 2006 - 3rd Place
 2007 - 2nd Place
 2009 - 3rd Place	
 2010 - 2nd Place
 2011 - 2nd Place	
 2012 - 3rd Place	
 2013 - 3rd Place
 2014 - 3rd Place
 2015 - 2nd Place	
 2016 - 2nd Place

Team Roster

Staff:Head coach Vesa JalavaAssistant coaches'''
 Janne Pisto 
 Mikko Rissanen
 Esa Katila
 Teemu Ivalo
 Ville Nevalainen

Huolto: Matti Kivimäki Risto Ranta Kimmo Kuvaja  Heljä Kivimäki Marko Kallio

The Crocodiles also has second team called Gators. The team has several youth teams and a number of cheerleading groups.

See also
 Helsinki Roosters
 Kuopio Steelers
 Tampere Saints
 Turku Trojans

References

External links
 Seinäjoki Crocodiles
 http://www.vaahteraliiga.fi/crocodiles/
 Team Facebook Page
 Team Twitter Page
 Team Instagram Page
 Gridiron Website

American football teams in Finland
Seinäjoki
1987 establishments in Finland
American football teams established in 1987